This is a list of leaders and office-holders of United States of America.

Heads of state and government 

Presidents of the United States
Vice presidents of the United States

Current and former members of the U.S. Congress 
Current members of the United States Senate
Former members of the United States Senate
Current members of the United States House of Representatives
Former members of the United States House of Representatives

Judicial officeholders 
Chief Justice of the United States
Justices of the Supreme Court
United States circuit judges
United States district judges

Heads of agencies 
Director of the CIA
Administrators of the United States Environmental Protection Agency

Heads of states and regional subdivisions 
United States governors

Governors of American Samoa
Governors of Guam
Governors of Northern Mariana Islands
Governors of Puerto Rico
Governors of U.S. Virgin Islands

Mayors and local officials

Heads of former states 
Monarchs of the Hawaiian Islands
Royal Consorts of the Hawaiian Islands
Kuhina Nui of the Hawaiian Islands
Presidents of the Republic of Texas

See also 
Lists of office-holders
United States order of precedence